Odet de Foix, Vicomte de Lautrec (1485 – 15 August 1528) was a French military leader. As Marshal of France, he commanded the campaign to conquer Naples, but died from the bubonic plague in 1528.

Biography
Odet was the son of Jean de Foix-Lautrec and Jeanne d'Aydie. He and his two brothers, the seigneur de Lescun and the seigneur de l'Esparre or Asparros, served Francis I of France as captains; and the influence of their sister, Françoise de Châteaubriant, who became the king's mistress, gained them high office.

In 1516, as marshal of France, Odet was made governor-general of the Milanese duchy, but his severity made the French occupation insupportable. He was present at the Field of the Cloth of Gold being in Francis I's royal entourage.

Odet arrived to resume the siege of Brescia, and on 26 May 1521, the Spanish and German garrison surrendered. The surrender was caused by the dissonance between the two factions, while Brescia was given over to Venetian commissioner, Andrea Gritti. In 1521 he succeeded in defending the Milan against the Spanish army. In 1522, under pressure from unpaid Swiss troops, Odet attacked entrenched Spanish-Imperial positions and was completely defeated at the Battle of Bicocca, losing Milan in the process. Odet fled back to France, and supervised the hostage exchange of Francis' sons following the latter's defeat at Battle of Pavia.

Sometime after his wife's death, Odet married Jeanne de Croy. In 1527 he received command of the army to conquer the kingdom of Naples. The defection of Andrea Doria and an outbreak of the plague or cholera in the French camp brought on a fresh disaster. Odet himself caught a disease and died on 17 August 1528.

Marriage
Odet married Charlotte d'Albret (1495–1527) in 1520. They had:

 Gaston (1522–28)
 Henry (1523–40)
 Claude (d.1549)
 Francis (d.1528)

References

Sources

1485 births
1528 deaths
Odet
Odet
Marshals of France
Military leaders of the Italian Wars
16th-century deaths from plague (disease)
Court of Francis I of France